This is a listing of fastest swimming times achieved at the Central American Games. These records are maintained by ORDECA, the Central American Sports Organization.
All times are swum in a long-course (50m) pool. All records were set in finals unless noted otherwise.

Men

Women

References

Central American Games
Records
Swimming